Mount Warrawolong is the highest point of the Watagan Mountains in New South Wales, Australia, rising to 641 metres (2,103 ft) above sea level.

References

Warrawolong